La jaula de oro (English: The Golden Cage) is a Mexican telenovela produced by José Rendón for Televisa in 1997.

On Monday, April 28, 1997, Canal de las Estrellas started broadcasting La jaula de oro weekdays at 9:00pm, replacing Te sigo amando. The last episode was broadcast on Friday, August 1, 1997 with María Isabel replacing it the following day.

Edith González and Saúl Lisazo starred as protagonists.

Cast 
Edith González as Oriana Valtierra/Carolina Valtierra/Renata Duarte
Saúl Lisazo as Alex Moncada/Franco
René Casados as Flavio Canet
María Teresa Rivas as Ofelia Valtierra Vda. de Casasola
Antonio Medellín as Omar
Patricio Castillo as Benjamín Acevedo
Cecilia Coronel as Elis Canet
Arcelia Ramírez as Martha
Vanessa Bauche as Cristina
Socorro Bonilla as Doña Tere
Fernando Sáenz as Valerio
Jaime Lozano as Artemio
Kenia Gazcón as Camelia
Alpha Acosta as Marianela
Isaura Espinoza as Dolores
Edi Xol as Alberto
Ricardo Dalmacci as Gustavo
María de Souza as Amira
Bárbara Gómez as Regina
Tony Marcín as Ana
Ana María Jacobo as Severina
Ernesto Rivas as Sergio
Janet Ruiz as Rosa
Fernando Rubio as Maximino
Zulema Cruz as Announcer
Claudio Rojo as Police officer
Judith Muedano as Receptionist
Francisco Haros as César Valtierra
José Olivares as Young man
Julián de Jesús Núñez as Pedro
María Dolores Oliva as Irene

References

External links

1997 telenovelas
Mexican telenovelas
1997 Mexican television series debuts
1997 Mexican television series endings
Spanish-language telenovelas
Television shows set in Mexico City
Televisa telenovelas